Just Like the Son is a 2006 American drama film written and directed by Morgan J. Freeman. The film was Freeman’s third from an original screenplay and shot during the summer of 2005 in New York City and Wilmington, North Carolina. It premiered at the 2006 Tribeca Film Festival, made its European debut at the 2006 Rome Film Festival and was released in North America on DVD/VOD by Breaking Glass Pictures.

Plot
Daniel Carter, a 20-year-old delinquent is sentenced to community service at a Lower East Side grade school, and develops a rapport with six-year-old Boone, who shares his fear of becoming an orphan due to his mother's illness. When Daniel learns that Boone has an older sister living in Dallas, he begins to question the state system that would place a child in foster care rather than engaging in a search for a next-of-kin. Several days later, when Boone does not show up for school, Daniel decides to make it his business to track the boy down and right the societal crime he sees unfolding. After locating Boone in a temporary foster care facility in Upstate New York, Daniel is turned down as an adoption candidate. And when he fails to convince his Father to help him gain custody, Daniel decides to rescue Boone from the orphanage and seek out this long-lost sister on his own. Employing all his street smarts, Daniel grabs Boone and they head off to Dallas.

References

External links

American independent films
Films set in New York City
American drama road movies
2000s drama road movies
2006 films
Films directed by Morgan J. Freeman
2006 drama films
2000s English-language films
2000s American films